The following is a list of events from the year 2022 in North Korea.

Incumbents

Events

March
 25 March – North Korea tested its longest-range ICBM.

May
 12 May
 COVID-19 pandemic – Pyongyang declared a "severe national emergency", after confirmed its first case of COVID-19. Kim Jong-un and the North Korean government orders all cities and counties throughout the entire country of North Korea into a nationwide lockdown, isolating all working, production and residential units. closing the borders of North Korea to all foreign nations including foreign trade, outsiders, North Korean citizens are banned from leaving the country or attempt to go travel abroad for all foreign countries, all foreign visitors and journalists are strictly forbidden to enter the country. all public, rail transports and airports are suspended, North Korea was entirely closed. only China a year were allowed to enter North Korea for trading purposes.
 Sunan district of Pyongyang fired three short-range missiles east of the Korean peninsula, two days after Yoon Suk-yeol took office as President of South Korea.
 13 May – State media confirmed six deaths and 350,000 new cases of COVID-19.

Deaths
 27 January – Ri Yong-mu, North Korean senior official who was a member of the Politburo of the Workers' Party of Korea, vice-chairman of the National Defence Commission of North Korea and vice-marshal of the Korean People's Army (born 1925)
 19 May – Hyon Chol Hae, military officer (born 1934)
 19 September – Pak Yong-il, politician, vice-chairman of the standing committee of the SPA (since 2019) (born 1966)

References

2022 in North Korea
2020s in North Korea
North Korea
North Korea